Cisthene is a genus of lichen moths in the family Erebidae. The genus was erected by Francis Walker in 1854.

Species
 Cisthene angelus (Dyar, 1904) – angel lichen moth
 Cisthene barnesii (Dyar, 1904)
 Cisthene batialis (Walker, 1859)
 Cisthene bisigna Berg, 1875
 Cisthene calochroma (Snellen, 1878)
 Cisthene citrina Druce, 1885
 Cisthene conjuncta (Barnes & McDunnough, 1913)
 Cisthene coronado C.B. Knowlton, 1967
 Cisthene deserta (Felder, 1868)
 Cisthene ditrigona (Schaus, 1899)
 Cisthene dives (Schaus, 1896)
 Cisthene dorsimacula (Dyar, 1904)
 Cisthene fasciata (Schaus, 1896)
 Cisthene faustinula (Boisduval, 1869)
 Cisthene fuscilingua Dyar, 1914)
 Cisthene hilaris Felder, 1875
 Cisthene juanita Barnes & Benjamin, 1925
 Cisthene kentuckiensis (Dyar, 1904) – Kentucky lichen moth
 Cisthene leuconotum (Dyar, 1914)
 Cisthene liberomacula (Dyar, 1904)
 Cisthene martini C.B. Knowlton, 1967
 Cisthene metoxia Hampson, 1898
 Cisthene minuta Butler, 1877
 Cisthene opulentana (Walker, 1864)
 Cisthene orbonella (Hampson, 1900)
 Cisthene packardii (Grote, 1863) – Packard's lichen moth
 Cisthene perrosea (Dyar, 1904)
 Cisthene petrovna Schaus, 1892
 Cisthene phaeoceps (Hampson, 1900)
 Cisthene picta (Barnes & McDunnough, 1918)
 Cisthene plumbea Stretch, 1885 – lead-colored lichen moth
 Cisthene polyzona Druce, 1885
 Cisthene rosacea (Schaus, 1896)
 Cisthene ruficollis (Schaus, 1896)
 Cisthene striata Ottolengui, 1898 – striated lichen moth
 Cisthene subjecta Walker, 1854 – subject lichen moth
 Cisthene subrufa (Barnes & McDunnough, 1913)
 Cisthene tenuifascia Harvey, 1875 – thin-banded lichen moth
 Cisthene triplaga (Hampson, 1905) (not to be confused with Brycea triplaga)
 Cisthene tyres (Druce, 1897)
 Cisthene unifascia Grote & Robinson, 1868
 Cisthene xanthospila (Hampson, 1900)

References

Cisthenina
Moth genera